Mireya Véliz (1915 - 5 September 2013) was a Chilean actress with a career of more than 50 years, retiring at the age of 96.

Career 
Véliz was featured in some of the first televised TV-theatre productions in Chile which were directed by Hugo Miller for Chile's Channel 13.

Before working in television she spent a number of years writing, directing and producing theatre for children. She later became part of the Teatre Ensayo which was a major University theatre company in Chile. Within this company she wrote radio-theatre and worked on the program La Voz de America which was recorded in the U.S. embassy.

In 1986 she was in the cast of the Universidad Catolica theatre production of Juan Radrigan’s El Pueblo de mal amor alongside other prominent actors such as Patricio Strahovsky and Gabriela Medina.  The play’s theme inspired by real events dealt with homelessness, displacement and exile and interplayed with the biblical themes of exile and the promised land.

Véliz worked in several television series in Chile; her last major role was in the popular telenovela Corazon de María, where she played the role of “Modesta” the mother of “Salvador” (Mauricio Pesutic).

Filmography

References

External links 
 

1915 births
2013 deaths
Chilean film actresses
Chilean television actresses
People from Santiago